Agnes Acibu is a Ugandan politician and member of the parliament.  She was elected in office as a woman Member to represent Nebbi district  during the 2021 Uganda general elections.

She is a member of the ruling National Resistance Movement party.

In the eleventh parliament, she serves on the Committee on HIV/AIDS and Related Matters.

See also 

 List of members of the eleventh Parliament of Uganda
 Neebi District
 National Resistance Movement
 Parliament of Uganda.
 Member of Parliament

References 

Members of the Parliament of Uganda
Women members of the Parliament of Uganda
21st-century Ugandan women politicians
21st-century Ugandan politicians
Living people
Year of birth missing (living people)